Vaskovo is a rural locality (a settlement) in Lisestrovskoye Rural Settlement of Primorsky District, Arkhangelsk Oblast, Russia. The population was 989 as of 2010.

Geography 
Vaskovo is located 25 km south of Arkhangelsk (the district's administrative centre) by road. Verkhniye Valdushki is the nearest rural locality.

References 

Rural localities in Primorsky District, Arkhangelsk Oblast